The 2004 Idaho Democratic presidential caucuses were held on February 24 in the U.S. state of Idaho as one of the Democratic Party's statewide nomination contests ahead of the 2004 presidential election.

Results

References

Idaho
2004 Idaho elections
2004